The All-Ireland Club Camogie Championship is a competition for club teams in the Irish women’s field sport of camogie. It is contested by the senior club champions of the leading counties and organised by An Cumann Camógaíochta.

Trophy
The trophy for the competition was donated by Bill Carroll, whose daughter, Ann was one of the outstanding players of the first decade of the competition, winning Championships with both St Patrick’s, Glengoole and St Paul’s, Kilkenny.

History
The competition was established in 1964, six years before the equivalent competitions in hurling and Gaelic football. Between 1971 and 1978 and since 2010, it was concluded in the spring following the county championships. On other years, it was concluded within the calendar year in November and December.

Teams from Kilkenny have won the competition 12 times, Cork with 8, followed by Galway and Wexford with 7 victories each, Limerick with 6, Dublin with 5, Tipperary with 4, and Derry with 3 victories.

A junior club championship was introduced in 2004 and won by Crossmaglen (Armagh). The intermediate club championship was introduced in 2010, and the first two titles were won by Eoghan Rua from Coleraine in Derry.

Senior Wins Listed By Club
Click on the year for details and team line-outs from each individual championship.

Intermediate Wins Listed By Club
Click on the year for details and team line-outs from each individual championship.

Highlights & Incidents
 The controversial replayed final of 1967, when members of the Camogie Association council decided extra time should be played at the end of the drawn final between Eoghan Rua and Oranmore. Oranmore refused to play and were granted a replay after an investigation into whether the respective team captains had been notified of the extra time arrangement in advance.
 Ann Carroll’s shooting seven of her team’s ten points for St Paul’s against Ahane in the 1969 final. She won a total of five club medals with both St Patrick's Glengoole and St Paul’s  Kilkenny.
 Val Fitzpatrick’s performance in Glen Rovers one point victory over St Paul’s in 1986.
 Ann Downey’s late goal  to win the 1988 title for St Paul’s the year her sister was suspended after a controversial all Ireland semi-final between St Paul’s and Killeagh on October 23. Angela Downey and Breda Kelly of Killeagh were reported for striking in the match, although neither was sent off. It led to a six-month suspension for both. If the final with St Mary's, Glenamaddy had not been called off 24 hours before it was due to start, she would have collected a seventh club medal.
 Emer Hardiman’s three goals for Mullagh in  their 1991 demolition of Eglish, who had pulled off one of the shocks of the century in defeating Celtic of Dublin in the All Ireland semi-final, having earlier defeated Loughgiel Shamrocks in the Ulster final by 3-7 to 2-4.
 Angela Downey’s four goals for Lisdowney in her last club final appearance in 1994
 Claire Grogan’s dramatic injury time equaliser for Cashel, followed by Carmel Hannon’s equally dramatic injury time winning point, and Patricia Burke’s goal line clearance at the end of the 2001 final.

All-Ireland Senior Club Camogie Finals
Click on the year for details and team line-outs from each championship.

All-Ireland Intermediate Club Camogie Finals

All-Ireland Junior Club Camogie Finals

All-Ireland Junior  B Club Camogie Finals

See also
 All-Ireland Senior Camogie Championship
 All-Ireland Junior Camogie Championship
 All-Ireland Intermediate Camogie Championship
 Wikipedia List of Camogie players
 National Camogie League
 Camogie All Stars Awards
 Ashbourne Cup

References

External links
 An Cumann Camógaíochta

 
Camogie competitions